Of all the seven historical bridges of Srinagar, the Amira Kadal Bridge also referred to as the "first Bridge" is a relatively newer one if compared with the rest of the six bridges. Built in 1774–77 by the Afghan Governor Amir Khan Sher Jawan, this bridge has been witness to many events of historical importance.

History
Titled "Diler Jang" by the Afghan ruler Timur Shah Durrani, Amir Khan Sher Jawan instead of seeking help from outside Princes, sought the help of Hanjis (boatmen) who were a sturdy class of people capable of answering his purpose.
With their help, he built the Amira Kadal bridge and the mansion called Sher Garhi Palace on the banks of the River Jhelum.
The building of the Amirabad garden on the western banks of Dal Lake and the construction of the Amira Kadal bridge projects him as a grand builder and somehow shrouds his image of a vandal who pulled down the royal palaces and other buildings around the Dal Lake which it had taken Mughals and their nobles 170 years to build.
From the pitiless Afghan tax-collectors flogging their way to extract zar-i-habubat (tax from farmers) to the footfalls of the hob-nailed boots of Dogras scaring the masses away the Amirakadal bridge has been a doubtless witness to the history of Kashmir.

Transport in Srinagar
Bridges in Srinagar